This supranational electoral calendar for 2015 lists the supranational elections held in 2015.

October
 15 October: United Nations Security Council, Security Council
 25 October: Argentina, Parlasur election

September
 6 September: Guatemala, Elections for the Central American Parliament
 15 September: United Nations Human Rights Council, Human Rights Council

References

External links

2015 elections
Supranational elections